Sudüğünü is a village in the Bingöl District, Bingöl Province, Turkey. The village is populated by Kurds and had a population of 1,226 in 2021.

The hamlets of Aktoprak, Çakır, Elmaçayırı, Esinli, Haroçayırı, Hılır and Konuksever are attached to the village.

References 

Villages in Bingöl District
Kurdish settlements in Bingöl Province